Páez is one of the 21 municipalities (municipios) that makes up the Venezuelan state of Miranda and, according to a 2007 population estimate by the National Institute of Statistics of Venezuela, the municipality has a population of 39,097.  The town of Río Chico is the municipal seat of the Páez Municipality.

Name
The municipality is one of several in Venezuela named "Páez Municipality" for independence hero José Antonio Páez.

Demographics
The Páez Municipality, according to a 2007 population estimate by the National Institute of Statistics of Venezuela, has a population of 39,097 (up from 33,259 in 2000). This amounts to 1.4% of the state's population.

Government
The mayor of the Páez Municipality is Emilio Ruiz, re-elected on October 31, 2004, with 39% of the vote.  The municipality is divided into five parishes; Río Chico, El Guapo, Tacarigua de La Laguna, Paparo, and San Fernando del Guapo.

References

External links
paez-miranda.gob.ve 

Municipalities of Miranda (state)